Federal Route 132, or Bukit Besi Highway,  is a major highway in Terengganu, Malaysia. The Kilometre Zero of the Federal Route 132 starts at Dungun.

At most sections, the Federal Route 132 was built under the JKR R5 road standard, with a speed limit of 90 km/h.

List of junctions and towns

References

Highways in Malaysia
Malaysian Federal Roads